is a 2022 Japanese animated film produced by Shin-Ei Animation. It is the 30th film of the anime series Crayon Shin-chan. The film is directed by Masakazu Hashimoto and the screenplay is written by both Masakazu Hashimoto and Kimiko Ueno. The film was released on 22 April 2022.

Premise 
One day, a woman named Chiyome Hesogakure with a child named Chinzō visits the Nohara family and claims that she is the real mother of Shinnosuke and takes him away to a Ninja Village. In the Ninja Village, the Hesogakure family has been protecting "the earth's navel" by blocking it with a pure gold stopper using the "Mononoke technique" that has been passed down from generation to generation. If it comes off, the earth will wither, the rotation will stop, and the "tomorrow" of the world will be lost! It is up to Shinnosuke to reveal the mystery of his birth and protect the future of the earth and the "tomorrow" of his family.

Cast 

 Yumiko Kobayashi as Shinnosuke Nohara
 Miki Narahashi as Misae Nohara
 Toshiyuki Morikawa as Hiroshi Nohara
 Satomi Kōrogi as Himawari Nohara 
 Mari Mashiba as Shiro and Toru Kazama 
 Tamao Hayashi as Nene Sakurada
 Teiyū Ichiryūsai as Masao Sato 
 Chie Satō as Bo Suzuki 
 Rina Kawaei as Chiyome Hesogakure 
 Ayahi Takagaki as Chinzō Hesogakure
 Natsuki Hanae as Gomaemon Hesogakure
 Jin Urayama as an elder of the ninja village
 Aoi Yūki as the elder's secretary
 Sora Amamiya as Fūko
 Yū Sawabe (Haraichi) as himself 
 Yūki Iwai (Haraichi) as himself
 Tesshō Genda as Action Kamen

Soundtrack 

  (Theme song): Ryoku Oushoku Shakai

Release 
The film got theatrical release in Japan on 22 April 2022. It was released on 8 September 2022 in theatres in Singapore by Muse Asia.

Box office 
Crayon Shin-chan: Mononoke Ninja Chinpūden debuted at no. 2 in its first weekend, with a sell of about 280,000 tickets in its first three days. According to Box Office Mojo, it grossed $14,895,696 at the box office.

Here is a table which shows the box office of this movie of all the weekends in Japan as of June 19. 2022:

See also 

 List of Crayon Shin-chan films

References

External links 

  

 

2022 films
2022 anime films
Mononoke Ninja Chinpūden
Ninja in anime and manga
Toho animated films